Charlotte Louise Perry (December 21, 1889 – October 28, 1983) was an American educator. She was inducted into the Colorado Women's Hall of Fame in 2004.

The daughter of Samuel Perry and Louise Manson, she was born in Denver, Colorado. From a young age, she developed a love for the outdoors and also for the theater. She received a BA in English literature and botany from Smith College in 1911. With Portia Mansfield, she established the Perry-Mansfield Performing Arts School & Camp in Steamboat Springs, Colorado in 1913. Besides the arts: dance, drama, art and music, the camp incorporated outdoor activities including tennis, swimming, horseback riding and overnight camping. It later became the oldest continuous dance school and camp in the United States. In 1994, she school was added to the National Register of Historic Places. Alumni included actors Lee Remick, Dustin Hoffman and Julie Harris.

When Portia Mansfield established the Portia Mansfield Dancers, later the Perry-Mansfield Dancers, Perry served as general designer and technical director and later was one of the leading dancers for the company.

In 1979, a documentary film A divine madness was created on the lives of Manfield and Perry.

References 

1889 births
1983 deaths
Educators from Colorado
Smith College alumni
Founders of schools in the United States
20th-century American educators
People from Denver
20th-century American women educators
20th-century philanthropists